Gonzalo Guerrero (also known as Gonzalo Marinero, Gonzalo de Aroca and Gonzalo de Aroza) was a sailor from Palos, in Spain who was shipwrecked along the Yucatán Peninsula and was taken as a slave by the local Maya. Earning his freedom, Guerrero became a respected warrior under a Maya lord and raised three of the first mestizo children in Mexico and presumably the first mixed children of the mainland Americas. Little is known of his early life.

Early life 
Scarce little is known of Guerrero's early life. He is presumed to have reached the New World aboard a Spanish expedition in the late 15th or early 16th century.

Career

Shipwreck and enslavement 1511

In 1511, Guerrero and nineteen other sailors were shipwrecked on the Las Viboras shallows off the coast of Jamaica, having been driven off course by a strong tropical storm. Lacking a seaworthy vessel and provisions, the survivors fashioned a makeshift raft and drifted for thirteen days across open sea until sighting the Yucatán Peninsula, though by this point, only ten of the survivors remained alive (including Guerrero).

Guerrero and his nine surviving crew-mates were immediately apprehended by the Mayan militia of Waymil upon their landing. Some or various were thereupon ritually sacrificed, with the remaining survivors forced into slavery under various provincial aristocrats.

Transfer to Chetumal 1514
In , Guerrero entered the service of Nachan Can, halach uinich or governor of Chetumal, while Gerónimo de Aguilar, his crew-mate, remained a slave of the batab or mayor of Xamanha. While in Chetumal, Guerrero is thought to have demonstrated superior military prowess, thereby earning military rank as nakom or commanding officer. He is thought to have served Chetumal or their allies during the 1517 Hernández de Córdoba and 1518 Juan de Grijalva entradas. Furthermore, during his time in Chetumal, Guerrero fully assimilated to Mayan culture, going so far as to convert to Mayan polytheism and to marry a Mayan woman, believed to have been the provincial governor's daughter. Guerrero and his wife's children are widely deemed the first mestizos of the New World.

Contact with Cortés 1519
Upon Hernán Cortés' 6 March 1519 landing in Cozumel, during the Spanish conquest of the Aztec Empire, the conquistador learned of Guerrero and his crew-mate, Aguilar, and promptly invited both to join the entrada to Tenochtitlan. Guerrero, however, declined Cortés' offer, noting he was duty-bound to care after his family in Chetumal. Cortés, on hearing this, renewed his offer, granting Guerrero leave to bring his family along. Again, Guerrero declined, this time noting he was further duty-bound to the provincial governor, of whom he was a slave.

On arriving in Cozumel from Cuba in 1519, Cortés sent a letter by Maya messenger across to the mainland, inviting the two Spaniards, of whom he had heard rumours, to join him. Aguilar became a translator, along with Doña Marina, 'La Malinche', during the Conquest. According to the account of Bernal Díaz, when the newly freed friar attempted to convince Guerrero to join him, Guerrero responded:

Spanish: "Hermano Aguilar, yo soy casado y tengo tres hijos. Tienenme por cacique y capitán, cuando hay guerras, la cara tengo labrada, y horadadas las orejas. ¿Que dirán de mi esos españoles, si me ven ir de este modo? Idos vos con la bendición de Dios, que ya veis que estos mis hijitos son bonitos, y dadme por vida vuestra de esas cuentas verdes que traeis, para darles, y diré, que mis hermanos me las envían de mi tierra."

English Translation: "Brother Aguilar; I am married and have three children, and they look on me as a cacique (lord) here, and captain in time of war. My face is tattooed and my ears are pierced. What would the Spaniards say about me if they saw me like this? Go and God's blessing be with you, for you have seen how handsome these children of mine are. Please give me some of those beads you have brought to give to them and I will tell them that my brothers have sent them from my own country."

Díaz goes on to describe how Gonzalo's Mayan wife, Zazil Há, interrupted the conversation and angrily addressed Aguilar in her own language:

Spanish: "Y asimismo la india mujer del Gonzalo habló a Aguilar en su lengua, muy enojada y le dijo: Mira con qué viene este esclavo a llamar a mi marido: idos vos y no curéis de más pláticas."

English Translation: "And the Indian wife of Gonzalo spoke to Aguilar in her own tongue very angrily and said to him, "What is this slave coming here for talking to my husband, – go off with you, and don't trouble us with any more words."

Then Aguilar spoke to Guerrero again, reminding him of his Christian faith and warning him against throwing away his everlasting soul for the sake of an Indian woman. But he did not convince Gonzalo.

According to Robert S. Chamberlain, Francisco de Montejo discovered that Guerrero was the military captain of Chectumal. He tried to win him over by sending him a longish letter reminding him of his Christian faith, offering him his friendship and a complete pardon, and asking him to come to the caravel. Guerrero replied by writing on the back of the letter that he could not leave his lord because he was a slave, "even though I am married and have a wife and children. I remember God, and you, Sir, and the Spaniards have a good friend in me."

Guerrero appears to have told his Maya friends and family that the Spaniards would suffer death like other men. He led the Maya in campaigns against Cortés and his lieutenants like Pedro de Alvarado and the Panamanian governor Pedrarias. Alvarado's instructions in his Honduras campaign included an order to capture Guerrero.

Montejo entrada 1527 
Guerrero is thought to have been pivotal to the failure of Francisco de Montejo's 15271528 entrada against Chetumal and other provinces in eastern Yucatán. Upon completing the northern portion of the campaign, Montejo, with eight to ten men aboard La Gavarra, anchored in Chetumal's harbour in the first or second quarter of 1528. Montejo, like Cortes before him, promptly invited Guerrero to join his campaign, promising high military honours. Guerrero again declined, citing his state of enslavement, though 'offering' Montejo his friendship. Chetumal, aware that Montejo awaited infantry reinforcements to take the city, successfully conspired to keep these from arriving by various deceits concealed as friendly aid. The reinforcements were deviated off course by 'friendly' scouts, while Montejo was gently coaxed into thinking his infantrymen had met an ill end, prompting him to depart in the second quarter of 1528 without having engaged.

Davila entrada 1531 
Guerrero is also thought to have fought an extended campaign against Alonso de Avila's 1531–1533 entrada, which managed to capture the provincial capital, but ultimately likewise failed.

Alvarado entrada 1536 

In late May or early June 1536, Pedro de Alvarado, determined to deal a death-blow to native resistance in the Sula Valley, lead a successful entrada against Cicumba's fortified camp on the banks of the Ulua River. Guerrero, who is thought to have lead or been among the Chetumal detachment reinforcing Cicumba's troops, died in battle from an arquebus shot.

Oviedo reports Guerrero as dead by 1532, when Montejo's lieutenants Avila and Lujón arrived again in Chectumal. Andrés de Cereceda, in a letter to the Spanish King dated 14 August 1536, writes of a battle that occurred in late June 1536 between Pedro de Alvarado and a local Honduran cacique named Çiçumba. The naked and tattooed body of a Spaniard was found dead within Çiçumba's town of Ticamaya after the battle. According to Cereceda, this Spaniard had come over with 50 war-canoes from Chetumal early in 1536, to help Çiçumba fight the Spanish who were attempting to colonize his lands. The Spaniard was killed in the battle by an arquebus shot. Although Cereceda says the Spaniard was named Gonzalo Aroca, R. Chamberlain and other historians writing about the event identify the man as Gonzalo Guerrero. Guerrero was likely 66 years old when he died.

Legacy

Knowledge of Guerrero's existence
There are no verified first-hand accounts written by Guerrero that have survived until today.  The primary accounts of other people writing about him are our source of information. First, there is Geronimo de Aguilar, who says Guerrero was captured by the Maya at the same time as he was. Cortés exchanged letters with Guerrero, but did not meet him face to face. Bernal Díaz de Castillo wrote about the same events as Cortes. Cereceda found him dead on a battlefield in Honduras but never communicated with him. The initial Spanish attempts to chronicle the conquest, done in the late sixteenth and early seventeenth centuries (Oviedo, Herrera), mention him, but are considered less accurate than the contemporaneous accounts.

Recent accounts
Although Guerrero appears in various historical chronicles of the conquest of Mexico and media and his existence is historically attested, some accounts of him are contradictory. These, coupled with often missing facts and historical falsehoods, have led over the centuries to a continuous redefinition of the character. This process started with the chroniclers of the 16th century and culminated in the 20th century with the Mexican Indigenismo, each with their own motivation and interpretation.

Literary critic Rose-Anna M. Mueller, in an essay titled From Cult to Comics: The Representation of Gonzalo Guerrero as Cultural Hero in Mexican Popular Culture, surveys the numerous depictions of Guerrero from a reviled figure for the sixteenth-century Spanish invaders to founder of modern Mexico. Yet, like many symbols, the reality behind this myth remains very questionable.

Mueller concludes, 'while primary and secondary sources sketched Guerrero's history during the colonial period, today he has become a political and literary icon and has been transformed into a national myth... If he was reviled by the chroniclers, Guerrero has enjoyed a vindication of sorts, since he has become an exemplar who fills the need to connect the colonisers from Europe and the indigenous of the Americas in a domestic context.'

Perhaps the most famous literary work celebrating Guerrero as the father of the mestizos in Mexico remains Gonzalo Guerrero: Novela historica by Eugenio Aguirre published in 1980 in Mexico. The novel became a national bestseller and went on to win the Paris International Academy's silver medal in 1981. Another popular book published in Mexico in 1999, Guerrero and Heart's Blood by Alan Clark tells of the inward life and history of Guerrero and Aguilar. Guerrero and Aguilar are central figures in the historical novel Maya Lord by John Coe Robbins which was published in the U.S. in 2011. "The Confessions of Gonzalo Guerrero", by John Reisinger, was published in 2015, and is an historical novel written from Guerrero's point of view, exploring his motivations and conflicts, as well as his relation with his Mayan wife.

American author David Stacton fictionalised Guerrero's life and exploits in his novel A Signal Victory (1960). Recently republished by Faber & Faber, the work is "David Stacton's eighth novel, and the first in what he envisaged as an 'American Triptych'... [It] paints a vivid picture of the impact of two great civilisations upon each other [and of] Guerrero's story – that of a man who found where his true loyalties lay, and pursued them to their inevitable end."

Archeologist Joseph Guinness, a character in Douglas Grant Mine's 2022 novel April and the Gardener, has long been obsessed with Gonzalo Guerrero. The second of the Cornell University professor's two long sojourns in late-20th century Central America – a region riven by political strife in which Guinness becomes dangerously involved – allows him to discover, with the help of an elderly Guatemalan scholar, a hitherto unimaginable side of the slave-turned-warrior chief.

In a historiographic essay, social psychologist Joachim I. Krueger reinterprets the story of Gonzalo Guerrero as a radical transformation of identity which raises questions about human nature: "Perhaps Gonzalo can encourage us to take another look at where we stand and who we are. What are the forces that shape us, and how will we respond when a storm throws us up against an unfamiliar shore?"

See also
 Maya civilization
 Spanish Conquest
 Spanish conquest of Honduras#Abandonment of Buena Esperanza, 1536
 Álvar Núñez Cabeza de Vaca

Notes and references

Explanatory footnotes

Short citations

References

Further reading
Gonzalo Fernández de Oviedo, Historia General y Natural de las Indias, Book XXXII, Chapter VI, 1851, Madrid.
Archivo de la historia de Yucatán, Campeche y Tabasco. 3 vols, ed. J. Ignacio Rubio Mañé (Mexico D.F., 1942).

External links
 Entre dos mundos - La historia de Gonzalo Guerrero, lit. Between two worlds – The story of Gonzalo Guerrero, a 2012 documentary directed by Fernando González Sitges and produced by TV UNAM.

Latin American folklore
Spanish explorers
Mexican literature
Colonial Mexico
16th-century Spanish people
1536 deaths
Year of birth unknown
Shipwreck survivors
People from Palos de la Frontera
16th-century slaves